is the Japanese version of the fire arrow. Bo-hiya were used in ancient Japan and by the samurai class of feudal Japan.

History and description
Fire arrows of some type have been used in Japan as far back as the 6th century where they are said to have been used during a military campaign in Korea. Bows (yumi) were used to launch these early fire arrows.

In 10th-century China, gunpowder was used to launch fire arrows, and this type of fire arrow was used against the Japanese by Mongolian naval vessels in the 13th century.

In 1543 the Japanese acquired matchlock technology from the Portuguese, and the resulting firearms developed by the Japanese led to new means of launching fire arrows. These rocket-type bo-hiya had the appearance of a thick arrow with large fins, a wood shaft and a metal tip; they resembled the Korean chongtong, an arrow-firing cannon. Bo-hiya were ignited by lighting a fuse made from incendiary waterproof rope which was wrapped around the shaft; when lit the bo-hiya was launched from either a wide-bore cannon, a form of tanegashima (Japanese matchlock) called hiya zutsu, or from a mortar-like weapon (hiya taihou). By the 16th century, Japanese pirates were reported to have used bo-hiya. During one sea battle it was said the bo hiya were "falling like rain". Bo-hiya were standard equipment on Japanese military vessels, where they were used to set fire to enemy ships.

Gallery

Similar weapons 

 Chongtong
 Cetbang

References

External links

Early firearms
Early rocketry
Japanese inventions
Samurai weapons and equipment
Weapons of Japan